Courtenay Selman (born 13 June 1945) is a Barbadian cricketer. He played in three first-class matches for the Barbados cricket team from 1970 to 1974.

See also
 List of Barbadian representative cricketers

References

External links
 

1945 births
Living people
Barbadian cricketers
Barbados cricketers
People from Saint George, Barbados